Dimitar Grabchev (born 10 May 1990) is a Bulgarian footballer who currently plays as a goalkeeper His first club was Maritsa Plovdiv.

Career
In June 2017, Grabchev joined his hometown club Maritsa Plovdiv. He left the club at the end of the 2017–18 season following the relegation to Third League.

References

External links

1990 births
Living people
Bulgarian footballers
First Professional Football League (Bulgaria) players
Second Professional Football League (Bulgaria) players
Association football goalkeepers
FC Maritsa Plovdiv players
PFC Lokomotiv Plovdiv players
PFC Pirin Gotse Delchev players
FC Oborishte players
FC Hebar Pazardzhik players